Taihape Area School is a state composite coeducational school located in Taihape, Manawatū-Whanganui, New Zealand. It is located on 26 Huia St.

The school has a roll of 244 students as of August 2017 and provides education for students in years 1–13.

History
Taihape Area School was formed in 2009 after Taihape's primary and secondary schools amalgamated. It was officially opened in October 2009 by former Minister of Education Trevor Mallard and local Rangitikei MP Simon Power. The reason for the amalgamation between the two schools was budget-based because of a decline in student numbers.

Between its establishment in 2009 and 2010 the principal was Boyce Davey and since 2010 it is Richard McMillan.

Facilities
The school was described by former principal Davey as "one of the most technologically advanced schools built in New Zealand". All 29 of its learning spaces are provided with large interactive touch sensitive whiteboards linked to computer systems.

Notable alumnae
James Paringatai, basketball player
Cecily Pickerill, plastic surgeon

See also
List of schools in Manawatū-Whanganui

References

External links
Taihape Area School's website

Secondary schools in Manawatū-Whanganui
Rangitikei District